Western Christian High School was a private Christian high school in west Phoenix, Arizona, at 67th and Clarendon avenues. It closed in 1988.

Christian schools in Arizona
Defunct Christian schools in the United States
Former high schools in Arizona
Educational institutions disestablished in 1988
High schools in Phoenix, Arizona